The Report of the Company Law Amendment Committee (1926) Cmnd 2657, known as the Report of the Greene Committee was a UK company law report led by Wilfred Greene M.R. that led to the Companies Act 1929.

Overview and excerpts
‘Public attention was directed by the decision in the City Equitable Case to the common article which exempts directors from liability for loss except when it is due to their wilful neglect or default… Another form of article
which has become common in recent years goes even farther and exempts directors in every case except that of actual dishonesty.’

‘We consider that shareholders representing a substantial portion of the voting power should have the right to requisition a certified statement of the remuneration, etc., paid to directors, including managing directors.’

The Report recommended increasing disclosure through common standards on accounts.

See also
Companies Act 1929
UK company law

Notes

United Kingdom company law
1926 in British law
Reports of the United Kingdom government